Laudatives (from Latin laudare "to praise") are words or grammatical forms that denote a positive affect. That is, they express praise or approval on the part of the speaker. Laudatory words are rare in English compared to pejorative ones, though there are a few, such as "steed" for a fine horse.  More common is laudative use of metaphor, such as calling a helpful person a "saint" or fine food "ambrosia".  Intonation may convey a laudative affect, as in "What a house!" said with an air of wonder. ("What a ..." with different intonation can express contempt.)

See also
Pejorative, or negative affect

References